Pirkeh may refer to:

Pirkeh-ye Olya
Pirkeh-ye Sofla